Passchendaele  is a community that is part of the former town of Glace Bay in the Canadian province of Nova Scotia, located in the Cape Breton Regional Municipality on Cape Breton Island .

References
  Passchendaele on Destination Nova Scotia

Communities in the Cape Breton Regional Municipality
General Service Areas in Nova Scotia